The sixth season of Hawaii Five-O premiered on September 11, 1973, and ended February 26, 1974. 24 episodes aired during this season. The Region 1 DVD was released on April 21, 2009.

Creator and executive producer Leonard Freeman died during this season.

Episodes 

1973 American television seasons
1974 American television seasons
06